The Peter Ballantyne Cree Nation (Rocky , Asinîskâwitiniwak) is a Woodland Cree First Nation in northern Saskatchewan consisting of eight communities: Denare Beach (Amisk Lake), Deschambault Lake, Kinoosao, Pelican Narrows, Prince Albert (Kiskaciwan), Sandy Bay, Southend and Sturgeon Landing. The administrative centre of the Peter Ballantyne Cree Nation is Pelican Narrows.

Government
Peter Ballantyne Cree Nation is governed by an Indian Act Chief and Council, elected for three year terms under the 2014 Election Code.

In 2003 and 2004, work in amending the Election Act was undertaken by staff and a Cree speaking lawyer.  PBCN membership consultations were done through utilization of community committees and staff for many months.  Membership at the time did a remarkable job in updating the 1994 Band Custom Election Act. However, the proposed 2004 Election Act did not pass the referendum process with 2 communities rejecting the new election act.

In August 2013, Chief and Council acquired funding from Indian Northern Affairs of Canada to begin the process again of amending the existing Election Act of 1994.  Due to limited funding from the INAC, Chief and Council had suggested the work done in 2003 and 2004 be revisited and taken back to the membership for further consultations and amendments.

The work to amend the 1994 Election Act started in early September 2013. The first round of community meetings with the membership were completed on October 23, 2013.  It was expected that the process would be fast-paced in order to meet the amendment deadline date. A tentative date to hold a band wide referendum was slated for January 30, or early February 2014.

The governance workers, Randy Clarke, Loretta Ballantyne, the band lawyer and other staff used input collected from technology such as surveys and the PBCN website as well as the community meetings to gather input from communities. After this process, the first draft of the 2014 Election Act was produced after it had been reviewed by the PBCN lawyer. The last round of consultations took place early December 2013 and it was passed in 2014 through a referendum. It was the membership of PBCN who decided on what amendments would be included in the election code, therefore, it was easily passed by the people.

There are 14 elected councilors, two each from Southend, Sandy Bay, and Deschambault Lake, five from Pelican Narrows, and one each from Denare Beach (Amisk Lake), Prince Albert (Kiskaciwan) and Sturgeon Landing. The centralized Government of the First Nation is located in Prince Albert, Saskatchewan.

Past leaders
2021-Present: Karen Bird
2013-2021: Peter A. Beatty
2007-2013: Darrell McCallum
2005-2007: Harold Linklater
2001-2005: Ronald Michel
1999-2001: Susan (Linklater)/ Custer
1985-1999: Ronald Michel
1979-1985: Joseph Custer
1975-1979: Phillip Morin
1973-1975: Albert Ratt
1971-1973: Arthur Morin
1969-1971: Simon Linklater
1958-1969: Peter Linklater
1956-1957: Simon Linklater
1954-1956: Vacant
1948-1954: Simon Linklater
1939-1948: Solomon Merasty
1930-1939: Joe Highway
1922-1930: Cornelius Ballantyne (Bear)
1911-1922: Peter Ballantyne

Reserves

Peter Ballantyne Cree Nation has reserved for itself several reserves:

 Amisk Lake 184
 Amiskosakahikan 210
 Birch Portage 184A
 Chief Joseph Custer
 Chief Philip Morin 232
 Denare Beach (settlement)
 Deschambault Lake (settlement)
 Kimosom Pwatinahk 203
 Kinoosao-Thomas Clark 204
 Kipahigan Sakahikan 222
 Kiskaciwan 208
 Kistapinan 211
 Kistapinanihk 231 (Urban Reserve in Prince Albert)
 Manawanstawayak 230 (
 Maskikopawiscikosik 229 (
 McKay 209
 Mirond Lake 184E
 Mistahi Wasahk 209
 Mistik
 Muskwaminiwatim 225
 Nakiskatowaneek 227
 Nemekus Sakahikan 221
 Northern Lights 220 (Urban Reserve in Prince Albert)
 Pelican Narrows 184B
 Pelican Narrows 206
 Pisiwiminiwatim 207
 Sandy Bay (settlement)
 Sandy Narrows 184C
 Sokatisewin Sakahikan 224
 Southend 200
 Southend 200A
 Sturgeon Landing (Settlement) 
 Sturgeon Weir 184F
 Sturgeon Weir 205
 Thomas Morin
 Wapaskokimaw 202
 Waskwaynikapik 228
 Waskwiatik Sakahikan 223 
 Woody Lake 184D

Notable people
Rick Harp, Co-founder and president of the INDIGENA Creative Group; former host/producer with the Aboriginal Peoples Television Network (APTN); set up mediaINDIGENA.com (an interactive, multimedia magazine dedicated to Indigenous news, views and creative expression); served as Artistic Director for the Winnipeg Aboriginal Film Festival.
Gary Merasty from Pelican Narrows, former MP
 Dr. Bonita Beatty from Deschambault Lake
 Judge Gerald M. Morin, First Cree-speaking indigenous person to be appointed as a judge to the Provincial Court of Saskatchewan
Cara Merasty from Pelican Narrows; first Cree speaking female lawyer from the PBCN

References

External links

First Nations governments in Saskatchewan
Cree governments